USS Pontus was a Motor Torpedo Boat Tender in service with the United States Navy during the Second World War. Commissioned in March 1943, during the war she was assigned to the Asiatic-Pacific Theater.

Following the war, USS Pontus was assigned to Occupation service in the Far East from 8 to 20 November 1945. She was decommissioned in 1946 and struck the same year after just 3 years of service. She was transferred to the Maritime Commission for disposal on 26 November 1947. She earned three Battle Stars for World War II Service. Her current status is unknown, most likely scrapped.

Ship Awards
American Campaign Medal
Asiatic-Pacific Campaign Medal(4)
World War II Victory Medal
Navy Occupation Service Medal(with Asia clasp)
Philippines Liberation Medal

References

Ships of the United States Navy
1943 ships